The 2023 Women's National Invitation Tournament is an annual single-elimination tournament of 64 NCAA Division I women's college basketball teams that were not selected for the field of the 2023 Women's NCAA Tournament. The tournament committee announced the 64-team field on March 13, following the selection of the NCAA Tournament field. The tournament first round started March 15 and will end on April 1 with the championship game televised by CBSSN.

Participants
The 2023 postseason WNIT field consists of 32 teams that received automatic berths - one berth from each conference - and 32 at-large teams. All Division I teams were considered for at-large berths, including those who are independent and/or are in the transition process of reaching full NCAA Division I status.  Automatic berths went to the highest-finishing team in its conference's regular-season standings, not selected for an NCAA Tournament berth. The remaining team slots were filled by the top teams available.

Automatic qualifiers

At-large bids

Bracket
* – Denotes overtime period
(H) - Denotes home team

Semifinals and Championship Game

Game summaries

Semifinals

See also
 2023 NCAA Division I Women's Basketball Tournament
 2023 Women's Basketball Invitational
 2023 Men's National Invitation Tournament

References

Women's National Invitation Tournament
Women's National Invitation Tournament